

Buildings and structures

Buildings

 Karlskirche in Vienna (begun 1716), designed by Johann Bernhard Fischer von Erlach, is completed by his son, Joseph Emanuel Fischer von Erlach.
 Melk Abbey in Austria (begun 1702), designed by Jakob Prandtauer, is completed.
 Town church of Piaseczno in Poland, designed by Carl Frederick Pöppelmann, is built.
 Rebuilt church of St George the Martyr Southwark in London, designed by John Price, is completed.
 Rebuilt St Swithun's Church, Worcester, England, designed by Thomas and Edward Woodward, is completed.
 Rebuilt Reformed Church, Șimleu Silvaniei in Romania is completed and consecrated.
 Reconstruction of church of San Marcuola on the Grand Canal in Venice, designed by Antonio Gaspari, is completed by Giorgio Massari.
 Church and Convent of Capuchins in Antigua Guatemala is consecrated.
 Khan Sulayman Pasha in Damascus is completed.
 Đình Bảng communal house in Vietnam is completed.
 Roskilde Royal Mansion (Denmark), designed by Lauritz de Thurah, is completed.
 Hermitage Hunting Lodge, designed by Lauritz de Thurah, is completed.
 Scots Mining Company House at Leadhills in Scotland, attributed to William Adam, is built (approximate date).
 North wing of house at Bregentved on the Danish island of Zealand, designed by Lauritz de Thurah, is completed.
 The Burrough's Building at Peterhouse, Cambridge, England, designed by James Burrough, is built.
 York House, St James's Palace, London, is built.
 Marschall Palais in Wilhelmstraße, Berlin, designed by Philipp Gerlach, is built.
 Hôtel de Hanau in Strasbourg is completed (begun in 1731)
 Hôtel de Klinglin in Strasbourg is completed (begun in 1732)

Births
 March 21 – Claude Nicolas Ledoux, French neoclassical architect (died 1806)

Deaths
 January 31 – Filippo Juvarra, Sicilian-born architect (born 1678)
 March 25 – Nicholas Hawksmoor, English architect (probably born 1661)
 October 22 – George Clarke, English politician, scholar and amateur architect (born 1661)

References 

Architecture
Years in architecture
18th-century architecture